Federico Seismit-Doda (1825–1893) was an Italian politician who gained prominence during the Revolutions of 1848 in the Italian states.

Frederico Seismit-Doda was born in Ragusa (Dubrovnik) in the Kingdom of Dalmatia (today's Croatia).
His family was an Albanian from the Doda tribe of Mirditë.
He graduated from the University of Padua and collaborated at Caffè Pedrocchi; in 1849 fought with the volunteers in Veneto and in 1849 participated in the defence of Roman Republic. After exile to Greece and to Piedmont in 1850, he collaborated in various newspapers and magazines, and published a volume of his memories Venetian Volunteers.

He died in Rome.

References

External links
 Biography 

1825 births
1893 deaths
Finance ministers of Italy
People from Dubrovnik
Italian politicians
University of Padua alumni